The Flatiron is a coloured photograph made by American photographer Edward Steichen in 1904. Its one of the best known photographs of his pictorialist phase. The photograph was part of the "International Exhibition of Pictorial Photography", held in the Albright Art Gallery, in Buffalo, in 1910.

History and description
The Flatiron building had been inaugurated in 1902 and it would become one of the most iconic buildings of New York. It soon attracted the attention of photographers like Alfred Stieglitz and Edward Steichen, who were trying to create photographs in the pictorialist style, in a similar way to painting. Steichen himself had training as a painter and with his technique of using gum bichromate over platinum print was able to add colour to this photograph of the Flatiron, taken at twilight, in Winter. He took the picture from the west side of Madison Square Park. He made three prints, respectively in blue, tan and orange-like colors. The final result seems inspired by the Japanese woodcuts, very popular at the time, and by American painter James McNeill Whistler Nocturnes paintings, while his subject is very distinctively American.

The Middlebury College Museum of Art website states: "Printed using colored inks, the photograph captures the interplay between the natural tree branches, the rainy streets, and the newly built Flatiron Building, one of the tallest buildings in New York at the time.(...) The building was a symbol of American technological progress; as Steichen’s colleague Alfred Steiglitz declared, “The Flat Iron is to the United States what the Parthenon was to Greece.”"

Art market
A print of this photograph, auctioned from the Paul G. Allen Collection, became the second most expensive ever at the art market on 8 November 2022, when it sold by $11,840,000, at Christie's New York, well above the estimate of $2,000,000-3,000,000.

Public collections
There are prints of this photograph in several public collections, including the Metropolitan Museum of Art, in New York, the Museum of Modern Art, in New York, the Whitney Museum of American Art, in New York, the Philadelphia Museum of Art, the J. Paul Getty Museum, in Los Angeles, the Minneapolis Institute of Art, the Middlebury College Museum of Art, in Middlebury, the Victoria and Albert Museum, in London, and the Museo Nacional Centro de Arte Reina Sofía, in Madrid.

See also
 List of most expensive photographs

References

1900s photographs
Photographs by Edward Steichen
Color photographs
Collections of the Victoria and Albert Museum
Photographs in the collection of the Museo Nacional Centro de Arte Reina Sofía
Photographs of the Metropolitan Museum of Art
Photographs of the Museum of Modern Art (New York City)
Photographs in the collection of the Philadelphia Museum of Art
Photographs of the J. Paul Getty Museum